The canton of Garéoult is an administrative division of the Var department, southeastern France. It was created at the French canton reorganisation which came into effect in March 2015. Its seat is in Garéoult.

It consists of the following communes:

Camps-la-Source
Carnoules
Forcalqueiret
Garéoult
Mazaugues
Méounes-lès-Montrieux
Néoules
Pierrefeu-du-Var
Puget-Ville
Rocbaron
La Roquebrussanne
Sainte-Anastasie-sur-Issole

References

Cantons of Var (department)